The Swadeshi movement was a self-sufficiency movement that was part of the Indian independence movement and contributed to the development of Indian nationalism. Before the BML Government's decision for the partition of Bengal was made public in December 1903, there was a lot of growing discontentment among the Indians. In response the Swadeshi movement was formally started from Town Hall at Calcutta on 7 August 1905 to curb foreign goods by relying on domestic production. Mahatma Gandhi described it as the soul of swaraj (self-rule). The movement took its vast size and shape after rich Indians donated money and land dedicated to Khadi and Gramodyog societies which started cloth production in every household. It also included other village industries so as to make village self-sufficient and self-reliant. The Indian National Congress used this movement as arsenal for its freedom struggle and ultimately on 15 August 1947, a hand-spun Khadi 'tricolor ashok chakra' Indian flag was unfurled at 'Princess Park' near India Gate, New Delhi by Jawaharlal Nehru.

The government's decision to partition Bengal was made in December 1903. The official reason was that Bengal, with a population of 78 million, was too large to be administered; the real reason, however, was that it was the center of the revolt, and British officials could not control the protests, which they thought would spread throughout India. Reappointed George Curzon, 1st Marquess Curzon of Kedleston Viceroy of India (1899–1905), in August 1904, he presided over the 1905 partition of Bengal.
 Bengal was divided by religion: the western half would be primarily Hindu, and the eastern half would be primarily Muslim. This divide-and-conquer strategy sparked the Swadeshi movement. The British reunited Bengal in 1911 and shifted their capital to New Delhi. The Swadeshi movement took on a new meaning after the reunification of Bengal.

Etymology 
Swadeshi is a conjunction (sandhi) of two Sanskrit words: swa ("self" or "own") and desh ("country"). Swadeshi is an adjective that means "of one's own country".

Timeline 
Swadeshi Movement has been characterized as cloth production in India.
 1850–1904: Dadabhai Naoroji, Gopal Krishna Gokhale, Mahadev Govind Ranade, Bal Gangadhar Tilak, Ganesh Vyankatesh Joshi, and Bhaswat K. Nigoni began organizing to promote Indian nationalism (the First Swadeshi Movement).
 1871-1872: Namdhari Sikhs boycotted English cloth in Punjab. Ram Singh Kuka boycotted English cloths, education and courts and instead promoted hand spun cloths 'khaddar', vernacular education and khap panchayats.
 1905–1917: The movement opposed the 1905 Partition of Bengal, which was ordered by Lord Curzon. Revolutionary groups in form of local clubs grew. Anushilan Samiti and Jugantar Party made attempts of arm revolts and assassination of notorious administrators.
 1918–1947: The movement was further strengthened by Mahatma Gandhi when he took a pledge to boycott foreign goods by burning 150,000 English cloths at Elpinstone Mill Compound, Parel, Mumbai on 31 July 1921. Mahatma Gandhi organized Khadi spinning centres all over the country and branded Khadi spinners as freedom fighters.
Indians started ditching British goods for Indian products, even though they were costlier. The impact was strong with British seeing 20% fall in its product sales. The trio of Lal-Bal-Pal organized several samitis, Bal Gangadhar Tilak led Ganesh Utsav as a means to popularize use and consumption of indigenous products from soil to sweets. Another notable figure in Swadeshi movement is V. O. Chidambaram Pillai in Tuticorin, who took over British India Steam Navigation Company and converted it into Indian-owned shipping company and named it Swadeshi Shipping Company in October 1906.

Influence
Swadehsi movement forms the backdrop of the novel Ghare Baire (The Home and the World), published in 1916, by Rabindranath Tagore. The novel, besides many other complex themes, shows the pitfalls of fervent nationalism. The 1984 film Ghare Baire (The Home and the World) by Satyajit Ray is based on the novel.
In 1982 the movie Gandhi (film) by Richard Attenborough, Indians vow on the bonfire of English cloths to wear swadeshi khadi after Gandhi's speech at Elphinstone Fort, Mumbai.
 According to a 1999 article, E. F. Schumacher (author of Small Is Beautiful) was influenced by Gandhi's concept of Swadeshi.
 On 7 August 2015, Prime Minister Narendra Modi commemorated the first annual National Handloom Day in India to promote indigenous handloom and khadi products. The date was chosen because on 7 August 1905, the Swadeshi movement was proclaimed to avoid foreign goods and use only Indian-made products. 
In 2019 the movie Manikarnika: The Queen of Jhansi (film) by Kangana Ranaut on the Queen, who fought valiantly against English in 1857, extensively used khadi (hand spun fabrics) made of cotton, brocade and paithani to mark the spirit of swadeshi. Prior to becoming the Queen, the historical figure learned how to made the fabric.
 In July 2020 Tooter is a new social media platform that was launched which is a cross-over between Facebook and Twitter. The social media platform has now garnered attention for calling itself the Swadeshi Andolan 2.0.
 On 18 August 2020 IT minister Ravi Shankar Prasad on Tuesday announced Swadeshi Microprocessor Challenge with award money of Rs 4.3 crore to key challenges after ban on Chinese investments.
On 17 July 2021 at the 18th Investiture Ceremony of the Border Security Force (BSF), Home Minister Amit Shah said that the Defence Research and Development Organisation (DRDO) and other agencies are working on an anti-drone swadeshi technology to deal with this danger of "Smuggling of drugs, arms, and explosives by drones has become a major challenge.
On 25 July 2021 Prime Minister Narendra Modi addressed the nation through the 79th episode of his monthly radio programme ‘Mann Ki Baat’ encouraging the people to buy Indian arts and crafts and attributed the increase in sales of khadi to its Indian patrons. "To buy khadi is to serve the people and the country #myhandloommypride should be used when you buy and post it online. He also reminded the celebration of National Handloom Day on August 7 "When the Swadeshi movement was launched years ago, many of our artisans were associated with it."
On 28 July 2021 Bangalore based GoCoop, India's first online marketplace for artisans and weavers is hosting Go Swadeshi, an exhibition showcasing handcrafted weaves from 30,000+ artisans, 12,000+ woman showcasing their largest collection of handmade textiles from India with over 70,000 products across sarees, apparel, accessories, home furnishings and fabrics. In 2015, GoCoop was the winner of Govt. of India's first National Award for Handlooms marketing (eCommerce) 2015.

See also

 Autarky – A country, state, or society that is economically independent
 Continental Association
 Juche – The North Korean philosophy of self-reliance
 Khadi and Village Industries Commission
 National Charkha Museum  
 Rajiv Dixit
 Sarvodaya
 Self-determination
 Stand-Up India
 Startup India
 Swadeshi Jagaran Manch

References

Further reading
Bandyopadhyay, Sekhar. From Plassey to Partition - A History of Modern India (2004) pp 248–62
Das, M. N. India Under Morley and Minto: Politics Behind Revolution, Revolution, and Reform (1964)
Gonsalves, Peter. Clothing for Liberation, A Communication Analysis of Gandhi's Swadeshi Revolution, SAGE, (2010)
Gonsalves, Peter. Khadi: Gandhi's Mega Symbol of Subversion, SAGE, (2012)
Trivedi, Lisa. "Clothing Gandhi's Nation: Homespun and Modern India", Indiana University Press, (2007)

External links

Economic nationalism
Gandhism
Indian independence movement
Rural community development